Dysschema thyridinum is a moth of the family Erebidae first described by Arthur Gardiner Butler in 1871. It is found in Ecuador and Peru.

References

Moths described in 1871
Dysschema